Střítež is a municipality and village in Pelhřimov District in the Vysočina Region of the Czech Republic. It has about 100 inhabitants.

Administrative parts
Villages of Bor and Krumvald are administrative parts of Střítež.

References

Villages in Pelhřimov District